Chicken and rice is a common food combination in several cultures which have both chicken and rice as staple foods.

Examples include:
Arroz con pollo, a Latin American dish
Claypot chicken rice, a clay pot dish popular in China, Malaysia and Singapore
Hainanese chicken rice, a Singaporean dish created by Hainanese immigrants in the country that is now popular in most of Southeast Asia as well as in Singaporean restaurants around the world
The Chicken Rice Shop, a restaurant chain
Chikin raisu (chicken rice, rice pan-fried with ketchup and chicken) (ja), an ingredient in Japanese omurice